The Munster Senior Club Hurling Championship (known for sponsorship reasons as the AIB Munster GAA Hurling Senior Club Championship) is an annual hurling competition organised by the Munster Council of the Gaelic Athletic Association since 1964 for the champion hurling teams in the province of Munster in Ireland.

The series of games are played during the autumn and winter months with the Munster final currently being played in November. The prize for the winning team is the O'Neill Cup. The championship has always been played on a straight knockout basis whereby once a team loses they are eliminated from the championship.

The Munster Championship is an integral part of the wider All-Ireland Senior Club Hurling Championship. The winners of the Munster final join the champions of Galway, Leinster and Ulster in the semi-final stages of the All-Ireland Senior Club Championship.

Five clubs currently participate in the Munster Championship, with the Kerry champions participating at intermediate level. The title has been won at least once by 27 different clubs. The all-time record-holders are Blackrock who have won five championship titles.

Ballygunner are the title-holders after defeating Kilmallock by 3-20 to 1-12 in the 2021 Munster final.

History

Beginnings
Since the foundation of the Gaelic Athletic Association in 1884, challenge, exhibition and tournament matches between clubs on an inter-county level were commonplace. Throughout the 1930s and 1940s, Glen Rovers of Cork and Ahane of Limerick regularly clashed in off-season games. In the 1950s the Cork Churches Tournament came to be recognised as the unofficial All-Ireland Club Championship. The tournament was an initiative by the then Bishop of Cork and Ross, Cornelius Lucey, to raise money to build five new churches in the fast developing suburbs of Cork. Participation was by invitation and was extended to the country’s current best hurling teams. This tournament lasted for five years, however, by the 1960s there was a growing appetite for a similar competition. In 1965 the Munster Council organised the inaugural inter-county club championship, with participation limited to the 1964 champion hurling clubs of each county. The inaugural championship suffered lengthy delays, with the final taking place in 1966. Since then the title has been awarded every year.

Team changes
Due to a lack of meaningful competition in their own province, all Galway teams competed in the various Munster Championships between 1959 and 1969. The creation of the club championship saw the Galway champions participate for the Munster title for six seasons from 1964 until 1969.

The 2007 Munster Club Championship was the last time that the Kerry champions participated in the competition. Historically seen as the weakest of the team involved, the Kerry County Board decided to regrade and enter their senior champions in the Munster Intermediate Club Championship.

Team dominance
While Cork clubs Glen Rovers and St. Finbarr's, Togher won the first two championship titles, Newmarket-on-Fergus became the first team to retain the championship in 1968. Roscrea completed their own two-in-a-row in 1970, however, the rest of that decade was the preserve of Cork clubs as Blackrock, St. Finbarr's, Togher and Glen Rovers claimed every available championship title. Mount Sion of Waterford broke the decade-long hegemony in 1981 by becoming the first Waterford team to win the championship. Tipperary clubs were dominant throughout the rest of the 1980s, with Moycarkey-Borris, Kilruane MacDonaghs and Borris-Ileigh all winning the provincial decider. As the decade drew to a close and the 1990s began, Limerick clubs made their first impression with Ballybrown, Patrickswell and Kilmallock being added to the roll of honour. Clare clubs dominated between 1995 and 2000, with Sixmilebridge, Clarecastle, Wolfe Tones and St. Joseph's, Doora-Barefield reflecting the county's dominance at inter-county level by also claiming the club championship title. The new century saw Newtownshanrum and Toomevara win five titles between them between 2003 and 2009, however, Waterford clubs also enjoyed success. Since 2011 the championship has been dominated by Limerick clubs, with Na Piarsaigh winning four titles in seven years.

The championship

Overview
The Munster Championship is a single elimination tournament. Each team is afforded only one defeat before being eliminated from the championship. Pairings for matches are drawn at random and there is no seeding.

Each match is played as a single leg. If a match is drawn there is a period of extra time, however, if both sides are still level at the end of extra time a replay takes place and so on until a winner is found.

Competition format
Quarter-final: Two teams contest this round. The winning teams advances directly to the semi-final stage. The losing team is eliminated from the championship.

Semi-finals: Four teams contest this round. The two winning teams advance directly to the final. The two losing teams are eliminated from the championship.

Final: The final is contested by the two semi-final winners.

Qualification

Winning managers
Managers in the Munster Championship are involved in the day-to-day running of the team, including the training, team selection, and sourcing of players. Their influence varies from club-to-club and is related to the individual club committees. The manager is assisted by a team of two or three selectors and a backroom team consisting of various coaches.

Trophy
At the end of the Munster final, the winning team is presented with a trophy. The cup, named the O'Neill Cup, is held by the winning team until the following year's final. Traditionally, the presentation is made at a special rostrum in the stand where GAA and political dignitaries and special guests view the match.

The cup is decorated with ribbons in the colours of the winning team. During the game the cup actually has both teams' sets of ribbons attached and the runners-up ribbons are removed before the presentation. The winning captain accepts the cup on behalf of his team before giving a short speech. Individual members of the winning team then have an opportunity to come to the rostrum to lift the cup.

The present trophy was donated by the Sarsfield's club in Cork in 1972 to commemorate Billy O'Neill who founded their club in 1903.

Roll of honour

Performance by club

Performance by county

List of Munster finals

Notes:
 1964 – The first match was abandoned: Glen Rovers 3-6, Mount Sion 2-6.
 1977 – The first match ended in a draw: St. Finbarr's 3-5, Sixmilebridge 3-5.
 1983 – The first match ended in a draw: Midleton 1-12, Borris-Ileigh 3-6.
 1985 – The first match ended in a draw: Kilruane MacDonaghs 1-8, Blackrock 1-8.
 2011 – The first match ended in a draw: Na Piarsaigh 1-11, Crusheen 0-14.

Records and statistics

Final

Team
Most wins: 5:
Blackrock (1971, 1973, 1975, 1978, 1979)
Most consecutive wins: 2:
Newmarket-on-Fergus (1967, 1968)
Roscrea (1969, 1970)
Blackrock (1978, 1979)
St. Joseph's, Doora-Barefield (1998, 1999)
Ballygunner (2021, 2022)
Most appearances in a final: 13:
Ballygunner (1966, 1968, 1996, 1999, 2001, 2005, 2009, 2015, 2017, 2018, 2019, 2021, 2022)
Most appearances in a final without ever winning: 2
 South Liberties (1976, 1981)
Most appearances in a final without losing (streak): 5
Blackrock (1971, 1973, 1975, 1978, 1979)
Biggest win: 19 points
 Blackrock 8-12 – 3-08 Mount Sion, (1975)
Most final defeats: 9
 Ballygunner (1966, 1968, 1996, 1999, 2005, 2009, 2015, 2017, 2019)

Teams

County representatives

By decade
The most successful team of each decade, judged by number of Munster Championship titles, is as follows:
 1960s: Two titles for Newmarket-on-Fergus (1967, 1968)
 1970s: Five titles for Blackrock (1971, 1973, 1975, 1978, 1979)
 1980s: Two titles for Midleton (1983, 1987)
 1990s: Two titles each for Kilmallock (1992, 1994), and St. Joseph's, Doora-Barefield (1998, 1999)
 2000s: Three titles for Newtownshandrum (2003, 2005, 2009)
 2010s: Four titles for Na Piarsaigh (2011, 2013, 2015, 2017)

Successful defending
Only 4 teams of the 27 who have won the championship have ever successfully defended the title. These are:
 Newmarket-on-Fergus in 1 attempt out of 2 (1968)
 Roscrea in 1 attempt out of 2 (1970)
 Blackrock on 1 attempt out of 5 (1979)
 St. Joseph's, Doora-Barefield on 1 attempt out of 2 (1999)

Barren spells
Top five longest gaps between successive championship titles:
 33 years: Borris-Ileigh (1986-2019)
 21 years: Mount Sion (1981–2002)
 20 years: Kilmallock (1994–2014)
 17 years: Ballygunner (2001-2018)
 11 years: Sixmilebridge (1984–1995)
 11 years: Toomevara (1993–2004)

Biggest wins
The most one-sided games from all stages of the championship:
 30 points – 1974: Kilmallock 6-16 (34) – (4) 0-04 Abbeydorney
 30 points – 1975: Mount Sion 8-13 (37) – (7) 1-04 St. Brendan's, Ardfert
 29 points – 1991: Lismore 5-18 (33) – (4) 0-04 Ballyduff

The most one-sided Munster finals:
 19 points – 1975: Blackrock 8-12 (36) – (17) 3-08 Mount Sion
 18 points – 2013: Na Piarsaigh 4-14 (26) – (8) 0-08 Sixmilebridge
 14 points – 1995: Sixmilebridge 2-18 (24) – (10) 1-07 Nenagh Éire Óg
 14 points – 1970: Roscrea 4-11 (23) – (9) 1-06 Clarecastle
 12 points – 1971: Blackrock 4-10 (22) – (10) 3-01 Moyne-Templetuohy
 12 points – 1965: St. Finbarr's, Togher 3-12 (21) – (9) 2-03 Mount Sion

Top scorers

Overall

Single game

Finals

Players

Miscellaneous
 John Horgan of Blackrock holds the record of being the only player to captain his club to three Munster club titles.  These victories came in 1971, 1973 and 1978.
 Cork clubs hold the record for the most consecutive appearances in Munster finals.  They played in twelve-in-a-row between 1969 and 1980, with success coming on eleven of those occasions.
 Cork is the only county to have completed the Munster junior, intermediate and senior treble at club level in the same year.  This feat was achieved in 2005 when Fr. O'Neill's, Ballinhassig and Newtownshandrum claimed their respective titles in their respective grades.
 Tipperary hold the record for the number of clubs that have won the Munster title, with nine different clubs all claiming provincial victories on behalf of the county.
 Both Ballygunner and Sixmilebridge jointly hold the record for appearances in Munster finals.  These two clubs have appeared in nine provincial deciders.
 Four clubs have secured back-to-back Munster titles: Newmarket-on-Fergus in 1968, Roscrea in 1970, Blackrock in 1979 and St. Joseph's, Doora-Barefield in 1999.
 Five players have captained both their club and their county to Munster titles: Christy Ring, John Horgan, Martin O'Doherty, John Fenton and Tommy Dunne.
 St. Finbarrs won the Munster Senior Club Football and Hurling championships in 1980 and are currently the only Munster club team to achieve this double.

References

 1